Global Voices is an international community of writers, bloggers and digital activists that aim to translate and report on what is being said in citizen media worldwide. It is a non-profit project started at the Berkman Center for Internet and Society at Harvard Law School that grew out of an international bloggers' meeting held in December 2004. The organization was founded by Ethan Zuckerman and Rebecca MacKinnon. In 2008, it became an independent non-profit incorporated in Amsterdam, Netherlands.

Objectives
When Global Voices was formed, Its objectives were: first, to enable and empower a community of "bridge bloggers" who "can make a bridge between two languages, or two cultures." Second to develop tools and resources to make achieving the first objective more effective. It has maintained a working relationship with mainstream media. Reuters, for example, gave Global Voices unrestricted grants from 2006 to 2008. For its contribution to innovation in journalism, Global Voices was granted the 2006 Knight-Batten Grand Prize. Global Voices was also recognized in 2009 with the University of Denver's Anvil of Freedom award for contributions to journalism and democracy.

The organization stated its goals : 
"Call attention to the most interesting conversations and perspectives emerging from citizens’ media around the world by linking to text, photos, podcasts, video and other forms of grassroots citizens’ media." 
"Facilitate the emergence of new citizens’ voices through training, online tutorials, and publicizing the ways in which open-source and free tools can be used safely by people around the world".
"Advocate for freedom of expression ... and protect the rights of citizen journalists".

Global Voices has a team of regional editors that aggregates and selects conversations from a variety of blogospheres, with a particular focus on non-Western and underrepresented voices. Contributors are volunteers.

Notable people
Arzu Geybullayeva

Raymond Palatino

Nanjala Nyabola

Omid Memarian

References

External links
 

Harvard Law School
Dutch news websites
Citizen media
Blogospheres
Multilingual news services
Organizations established in 2004